Elizabeth Township is one of the twelve townships of Miami County, Ohio, United States.  The 2000 census found 1,620 people in the township.

Geography
Located in the eastern part of the county, it borders the following townships:
Lostcreek Township - north
Jackson Township, Champaign County - northeast corner
Pike Township, Clark County - east
Bethel Township - south
Staunton Township - west

No municipalities are located in Elizabeth Township.

Name and history
Statewide, the only other Elizabeth Township is located in Lawrence County.

Government
The township is governed by a three-member board of trustees, who are elected in November of odd-numbered years to a four-year term beginning on the following January 1. Two are elected in the year after the presidential election and one is elected in the year before it. There is also an elected township fiscal officer, who serves a four-year term beginning on April 1 of the year after the election, which is held in November of the year before the presidential election. Vacancies in the fiscal officership or on the board of trustees are filled by the remaining trustees.

References

External links
County website
Township website

Townships in Miami County, Ohio
Townships in Ohio